Essex is a county in the East of England. One of the home counties, it borders Suffolk and Cambridgeshire to the north, the North Sea to the east, Hertfordshire to the west, Kent across the estuary of the River Thames to the south, and Greater London to the south and south-west. There are three cities in Essex: Southend, Colchester and Chelmsford, in order of population. For the purposes of government statistics, Essex is placed in the East of England region. There are four definitions of the extent of Essex, the widest being the ancient county. Next, the largest is the former postal county, followed by the ceremonial county, with the smallest being the administrative county—the area administered by the County Council, which excludes the two unitary authorities of Thurrock and Southend-on-Sea. The ceremonial county occupies the eastern part of what was, during the Early Middle Ages, the Anglo-Saxon Kingdom of Essex. As well as rural areas and urban areas, it forms part of the wider Home Counties of England.

History 

Essex evolved from the Kingdom of the East Saxons, a polity which is likely to have its roots in the territory of the Iron Age Trinovantes tribe.

Iron Age
Essex corresponds, fairly closely, to the territory of the Trinovantes tribe. Their production of their own coinage marks them out as one of the more advanced tribes on the island, this advantage (in common with other tribes in the south-east) is probably due to the Belgic element within their elite. Their capital was the oppidum (a type of town) of Colchester, Britain's oldest recorded town, which had its own mint.
The tribe were in extended conflict with their western neighbours, the Catuvellauni, and steadily lost ground. By AD 10 they had come under the complete control of the Catuvellauni, who took Colchester as their own capital.

Roman
The Roman invasion of AD 43 began with a landing on the south coast, probably in the Richborough area of Kent. After some initial successes against the Britons, they paused to await reinforcements, and the arrival of the Emperor Claudius.  The combined army then proceeded to the capital of the Catevellauni-Trinovantes at Colchester, and took it.

Claudius held a review of his invasion force on Lexden Heath where the army formally proclaimed him Imperator. The invasion force that assembled before him included four legions, mounted auxiliaries and an elephant corps – a force of around 30,000 men. At Colchester, the kings of 11 British tribes surrendered to Claudius.

Colchester became a Roman Colonia, with the official name Colonia Claudia Victricensis ('the City of Claudius' Victory'). It was initially the most important city in Roman Britain and in it they established a temple to the God-Emperor Claudius. This was the largest building of its kind in Roman Britain.

The establishment of the Colonia is thought to have involved extensive appropriation of land from local people, this and other grievances led to the Trinovantes joining their northern neighbours, the Iceni, in the Boudiccan revolt. The rebels entered the city, and after a Roman last stand at the temple of Claudius, methodically destroyed it, massacring many thousands. A significant Roman force attempting to relieve Colchester was destroyed in pitched battle, known as the Massacre of the Ninth Legion.

The rebels then proceeded to sack London and St Albans, with Tacitus estimating that 70–80,000 people were killed in the destruction of the three cities. Boudicca was defeated in battle, somewhere in the west midlands, and the Romans are likely to have ravaged the lands of the rebel tribes, so Essex will have suffered greatly.

Despite this, the Trinovantes' identity persisted. Roman provinces were divided into civitas for local government purposes – with a civitas for the Trinovantes strongly implied by Ptolemy. Christianity is thought to have been flourishing among the Trinovantes in the fourth century, indications include the remains of a probable church at Colchester, the church dates from sometime after 320, shortly after the Constantine the Great granted freedom of worship to Christians in 313. Other archaeological evidence include a chi-rho symbol etched on a tile at a site in Wickford, and a gold ring inscribed with a chi-rho monogram found at Brentwood.

The late Roman period, and the period shortly after, was the setting for the King Cole legends based around Colchester. One version of the legend concerns St Helena, the mother of Constantine the Great. The legend makes her the daughter of Coel, Duke of the Britons (King Cole) and in it she gives birth to Constantine in Colchester. This, and related legends, are at variance with biographical details as they are now known, but it is likely that Constantine, and his father, Constantius spent time in Colchester during their years in Britain. The presence of St Helena in the country is less certain.

Anglo-Saxon period

The name Essex originates in the Anglo-Saxon period of the Early Middle Ages and has its root in the Anglo-Saxon (Old English) name Ēastseaxe ("East Saxons"), the eastern kingdom of the Saxons who had come from the continent and settled in Britain. Excavations at Mucking have demonstrated the presence of Anglo-Saxon settlers in the early fifth century, however the way in which these settlers became ascendent in the territory of the Trinovantes is not known. Studies suggest a pattern of typically peaceful co-existence, with the structure of the Romano-British landscape being maintained, and with the Saxon settlers believed to have been in the minority.

The first known king of the East Saxons was Sledd in 587, though there are less reliable sources giving an account of Aescwine (other versions call him Erkenwine) founding the kingdom in 527. The early kings of the East Saxons were pagan and uniquely amongst the Anglo-Saxon kingdoms traced their lineage back to Seaxnēat, god of the Saxons, rather than Woden. The kings of Essex are notable for their S-nomenclature, nearly all of them begin with the letter S.

The Kingdom of the East Saxons included not just the subsequent county of Essex, but also Middlesex (including the City of London), much of Hertfordshire and at times also the sub-Kingdom of Surrey. The Middlesex and Hertfordshire parts were known as the Province of the Middle Saxons since at least the early eighth century but it is not known if the province was previously an independent unit that came under East Saxon control. Charter evidence shows that the Kings of Essex appear to have had a greater control in the core area, east of the Lea and Stort, that would subsequently become the county of Essex. In the core area they granted charters freely, but further west they did so while also making reference to their Mercian overlords.

The early kings were pagan, together with much and perhaps by this time all of the population. Sledd's son Sebert converted to Christianity around 604 and St Pauls Cathedral in London was established. On Sebert's death in 616 his sons renounced Christianity and drove out Mellitus, the Bishop of London. The kingdom re-converted after St Cedd, a monk from Lindisfarne and now the patron saint of Essex, converted Sigeberht II the Good around 653.

In AD 824, Ecgberht, the King of the Wessex and grandfather of Alfred the Great, defeated the Mercians at the Battle of Ellandun in Wiltshire, fundamentally changing the balance of power in southern England. The small kingdoms of Essex, Sussex and of Kent, previously independent albeit under Mercian overlordship, were subsequently fully absorbed into Wessex.

The later Anglo-Saxon period shows three major battles fought with the Norse recorded in Essex; the Battle of Benfleet in 894, the Battle of Maldon in 991 and the Battle of Assandun (probably at either Ashingdon or Ashdon) in 1016.
The county of Essex was formed from the core area, east of the River Lea, of the former Kingdom of the East Saxons in the 9th or 10th centuries and divided into groupings called Hundreds.
Before the Norman conquest the East Saxons were subsumed into the Kingdom of England.

After the Norman Conquest
Having conquered England, William the Conqueror initially based himself at Barking Abbey, an already ancient nunnery, for several months while a secure base, which eventually became the Tower of London could be established in the city. While at Barking William received the submission of some of England's leading nobles. The invaders established a number of castles in the county, to help protect the new elites in a hostile country. There were castles at Colchester, Castle Hedingham, Rayleigh, Pleshey and elsewhere. Hadleigh Castle was developed much later, in the thirteenth century.

After the arrival of the Normans, the Forest of Essex was established as a Royal forest, however, it is important to note that at that time, the term was a legal term. There was a weak correlation between the area covered by the Forest of Essex (the large majority of the county) and the much smaller area covered by woodland. An analysis of Domesday returns for Essex has shown that the Forest of Essex was mostly farmland, and that the county as a whole was 20% wooded in 1086.

After that point population growth caused the proportion of woodland to fall steadily until the arrival of the Black Death, in 1348, killed between a third and a half of England's population, leading to a long term stabilisation of the extent of woodland. Similarly, various pressures led to areas being removed from the legal Forest of Essex and it ceased to exist as a legal entity after 1327, and after that time Forest Law applied to smaller areas: the forests of Writtle (near Chelmsford), long lost Kingswood (near Colchester), Hatfield, and Waltham Forest.

Waltham Forest had covered parts of the Hundreds of Waltham, Becontree and Ongar. It also included the physical woodland areas subsequently legally afforested (designated as a legal forest) and known as Epping Forest and Hainault Forest).

Peasants Revolt, 1381
The Black Death significantly reduced England's population, leading to a change in the balance of power between the working population on one hand, and their masters and employers on the other. Over a period of several decades, national government brought in legislation to reverse the situation, but it was only partially successful and led to simmering resentment.

By 1381, England's economic situation was very poor due to the war with France, so a new Poll Tax was levied with commissioners being sent round the country to interrogate local officials in an attempt to ensure tax evasion was reduced and more money extracted. This was hugely unpopular and the Peasants' Revolt  broke out in Brentwood on 1 June 1381.

Several thousand Essex rebels gathered at Bocking on June 4, and then divided. Some heading to Suffolk to raise rebellion there, with the rest heading to London, some directly – via Bow Bridge and others may have gone via Kent. A large force of Kentish rebels also advanced on London while revolt also spread to a number of other parts of the country.

The rebels gained access to the walled City of London and gained control of the Tower of London. They carried out extensive looting in the capital and executed a number of their enemies, but the revolt began to dissipate after the events at West Smithfield on 15 June, when the Mayor of London, William Walworth, killed the rebel leader Wat Tyler. The rebels prepared to fire arrows at the royal party but the 15 year old King Richard II rode toward the crowd and spoke to them, defusing the situation, in part by making a series of promises he did not subsequently keep.

Having bought himself time, Richard was able to receive reinforcements and then crush the rebellion in Essex and elsewhere. His forces defeated rebels in battle at Billericay on the 28th June, and there were mass executions; hangings and disembowelling at Chelmsford and Colchester.

Wars of the Roses
In 1471, during the Wars of the Roses a force of around 2,000 Essex supporters of the Lancastrian cause crossed Bow Bridge to join with 3,000 Kentish Lancastrian supporters under the Bastard of Fauconberg.

The Essex men joined with their allies in attempting to storm Aldgate and Bishopsgate during an assault known as the Siege of London. The Lancastrians were defeated, and the Essex contingent retreated back over the Lea with heavy losses.

Armada
In 1588 Tilbury Fort was chosen as the focal point of the English defences against King Philip II's Spanish Armada, and the large veteran army he had ordered to invade England. The English believed that the Spanish would land near the Fort, so Queen Elizabeth's small and relatively poorly trained forces gathered at Tilbury, where the Queen made her famous speech to the troops.

Civil War
Essex, London and the eastern counties backed Parliament in the English Civil War, but by 1648, this loyalty was stretched. In June 1648 a force of 500 Kentish Royalists landed near the Isle of Dogs, linked up with a small Royalist cavalry force from Essex, fought a battle with local parliamentarians at Bow Bridge, then crossed the River Lea into Essex.

The combined force, bolstered by extra forces, marched towards Royalist held Colchester, but a Parliamentarian force caught up with them just as they were about to enter the city's medieval walls, and a bitter battle was fought but the Royalists were able to retire to the security of the walls. The Siege of Colchester followed, but ten weeks' starvation and news of Royalist defeats elsewhere led the Royalists to surrender.

Geography 

The ceremonial county of Essex is bounded by Kent, south of the Thames Estuary; Greater London to the south-west; Hertfordshire, broadly west of the River Lea and the Stort; Cambridgeshire to the northwest; Suffolk broadly north of the River Stour; with the North Sea to the east. The highest point of the county of Essex is Chrishall Common near the village of Langley, close to the Hertfordshire border, which reaches .

Boundaries 
In England, the term county is currently applied to a number of different geographical units: the historic counties, the ceremonial counties (or lieutenancy areas) and the non-metropolitan counties. Therefore, Essex has different boundaries depending on which type of county is being referred to.The largest extent of Essex is the historic county, which includes 'Metropolitan Essex' i.e. areas within the London conurbation such as Romford and West Ham. These boundaries for Essex was established in the late Anglo-Saxon period, some time after the larger former Kingdom of the East Saxons had lost its independence. It includes the whole ceremonial county, as well as the three north-western parishes (transferred to Cambridgeshire in 1889), and the five London boroughs previously administered as part of Essex.The administrative county and County Council was formed in 1889. The county was made a non-metropolitan county as part of the 1970s local government reorganisation. Its present boundaries were set in 1998 when the Thurrock and Southend-on-Sea separated from the non-metropolitan county to become unitary authorities. In 1997, the Lieutenancies Act, which defined Essex for ceremonial purposes as the current non-metropolitan county and the unitary authorities formerly part of it.

Until 1996, the Royal Mail additionally divided Britain into postal counties, used for addresses. Although it adopted many local government boundary changes, the Royal Mail did not adopt the 1965 London boundary reform due to cost. Therefore, parts of post-1965 Greater London continued to have an Essex address. The postal county of Hertfordshire also extended deep into west Essex, with Stansted isolated as an exclave of postal Essex. In 1996, postal counties were discountinued and replaced entirely by postcodes, though customers may still use a county, which will be ignored in the sorting process.

Coast
The deep estuaries on the east coast give Essex, by some measures, the longest coast of any county. These estuaries mean the county's North Sea coast is characterised by three major peninsulas, each named after the Hundred based on the peninsula:
 Tendring between the Stour and the Colne.
 Dengie between the Blackwater and the Crouch
 Rochford between the Crouch and the Thames
A consequence of these features is that the broad estuaries defining them have been a factor in preventing any transport infrastructure linking them to neighbouring areas on the other side of the river estuaries, to the north and south.

Settlement patterns
The pattern of settlement in the county is diverse. The areas closest to London are the most densely settled, though the Metropolitan Green Belt has prevented the further sprawl of London into the county. The Green Belt was initially a narrow band of land, but subsequent expansions meant it was able to limit the further expansion of many of the commuter towns close to the capital. The Green Belt zone close to London includes many prosperous commuter towns, as well as the new towns of Basildon and Harlow, originally developed to resettle Londoners after the destruction of London housing in the Second World War; they have since been significantly developed and expanded. Epping Forest also prevents the further spread of the Greater London Urban Area. As it is not far from London, with its economic magnetism, many of Essex's settlements, particularly those near or within short driving distance of railway stations, function as dormitory towns or villages where London workers raise their families. In these areas a high proportion of the population commute to London, and the wages earned in the capital are typically significantly higher than more local jobs. Many parts of Essex therefore, especially those closest to London, have a major economic dependence on London and the transport links that take people to work there.

Part of the south-east of the county, already containing the major population centres of Basildon, Southend and Thurrock, is within the Thames Gateway and designated for further development. Parts of the south-west of the county, such as Buckhurst Hill and Chigwell, are contiguous with Greater London neighbourhoods and therefore form part of the Greater London Urban Area.

A small part of the south-west of the county, Sewardstone, is the only settlement outside Greater London to be covered by a postcode district of the London post town. Besides the cities of Colchester, Chelmsford and Southend-on-Sea, the county is rural, with many small towns, villages and hamlets largely built in the traditional materials of timber and brick, with clay tile or thatched roofs.

Administrative history

Before the County Council
Before the creation of the county councils, county-level administration was limited in nature; lord-lieutenants replaced the sheriffs from the time of Henry VIII and took a primarily military role, responsible for the militia and the Volunteer Force that replaced it.

Most administration was carried out by justices of the peace (JPs) appointed by the Lord-Lieutenant of Essex based upon their reputation. The JPs carried out judicial and administrative duties such as maintenance of roads and bridges, supervision of the poor laws, administration of county prisons and setting the County Rate. JPs carried out these responsibilities, mainly through quarter sessions, and did this on a voluntary basis.

At this time the county was sub-divided into units known as Hundreds. At a very early but unknown date, small parts of the county   on the east bank of the Stort, near Bishops Stortford and Sawbridgeworth were transferred to Hertfordshire

County Councils
Essex County Council was formed in 1889. However, County Boroughs of West Ham (1889–1965), Southend-on-Sea (1914–1974) and East Ham (1915–1965) formed part of the county but were county boroughs (not under county council control, in a similar manner to unitary authorities today). 12 boroughs and districts provide more localised services such as rubbish and recycling collections, leisure and planning, as shown in the map on the right.

The north-west tip of Essex, the parishes of Great Chishill, Little Chishill and Heydon, were transferred to Cambridgeshire when the County Councils were created in 1889. Parts of a number of other parishes were also transferred at that time, and since.

Greater London established
The boundary with Greater London was established in 1965, when East Ham and West Ham county boroughs and the Barking, Chingford, Dagenham, Hornchurch, Ilford, Leyton, Romford, Walthamstow and Wanstead and Woodford districts as well as a part of Chigwell were transferred to form the London boroughs of Barking and Dagenham, Havering, Newham, Redbridge and Waltham Forest.

Two unitary authorities
In 1998, the boroughs of Southend-on-Sea and Thurrock were separated from the administrative county of Essex after successful requests to become unitary authorities.

Administration and politics

Essex County Council 

The county council governs the non-metropolitan county of Essex in England. It has 75 councillors, elected from 70 divisions, some of which elect more than one member, but before 1965, the number of councillors reached over 100. The council is currently under No overall control, with the Labour Party working in a coalition with the Liberal Democrats and Independent politicians to form the administration.[2] The council meets at County Hall in the centre of Chelmsford.

At the time of the 2011 census it served a population of 1,393,600, which makes it one of the largest local authorities in England. As a non-metropolitan county council, responsibilities are shared between districts (including boroughs) and in many areas also between civil parish (including town) councils. Births, marriages/civil partnerships and death registration, roads, libraries and archives, refuse disposal, most of state education, of social services and of transport are provided at the county level.[3]

The county council was formed in 1889, governing the administrative county of Essex. The county council was reconstituted in 1974 as a non-metropolitan county council, regaining jurisdiction in Southend-on-Sea; however, the non-metropolitan county was reduced in size in 1998 and the council passed responsibilities to Southend-on-Sea Borough Council and Thurrock Council in those districts. For certain services the three authorities co-operate through joint arrangements, such as the Essex fire authority.

At the 2013 County Council elections the Conservative Party retained overall control of the council, but its majority fell from twenty-two to four councillors. UKIP, Labour and the Liberal Democrats each won nine seats. Out of those three parties, UKIP gained the largest share of the county-wide vote, more than 10% ahead of Labour.[3] The Liberal Democrats remain as the official Opposition, despite winning fewer votes.[3] The Green Party gained two seats on the council, despite its overall share of the vote falling. The Independent Loughton Residents Association and the Canvey Island Independent Party both returned one member and an Independent candidate was also elected.

The 2017 County Council elections saw a county-wide wipeout of UKIP. The Conservative Party profited most from this loss, regaining many of the seats it had lost at the previous election. Labour, despite a slight rise in its share of the vote, had fewer councillors elected. The Liberal Democrats also saw a notable revival, but were unable to translate this into seats. The Conservatives retained firm control of the council. The next election will be in 2021.

|-
! rowspan="2" colspan="2" style="text-align:left;" | Party
! colspan="4"|Votes cast
! colspan="4"|%
! colspan="4"|Seats
|-
!2009
!2013
!2017
! ±
!2009
!2013
!2017
! ±
!2009
!2013
!2017
! ±
|-
| style="background:#0087dc;"|
| style="text-align:left;" | Conservative
| 169,975
| 112,229
| 184,901
|  72,672
| 43.3
| 34.4
| 49.3
|  14.9
| 60
| 42
| 56
| 14
|-
| style="background:#dc241f;"|
| style="text-align:left;" | Labour
| 42,334
| 57,290
| 63,470
|  6,180
| 10.8
| 16.4
| 16.9
|  0.5
| 1
| 9
| 6
|  3
|-
| style="background:#fdbb30;"|
| style="text-align:left;" | Liberal Democrat
| 79,085
| 35,651
| 51,524
|  15,873
| 20.1
| 11.6
| 13.7
|  2.1
| 12
| 9
| 7
|  2
|-
| style="background:#70147a;"|
| style="text-align:left;" | UKIP
| 18,186
| 90,812
| 29,796
|  61,016
| 4.6
| 27.6
| 7.9
|  19.7
| 0
| 9
| 0
|  9
|-
| style="background:#6ab023;"|
| style="text-align:left;" | Green
| 26,547
| 15,187
| 15,187
| 
| 6.8
| 4.8
| 4.3
|  0.5
| 0
| 2
| 1
| 1
|-
| style="background:#e9e9e9;"|
| style="text-align:left;" | Independents
| 5,845
| 4,631
| 12,506
|  7,875
| 1.5
| 0.6
| 2.4
|  1.8
| 0
| 1
| 2
|  1
|-
| style="background-color:;" |
| style="text-align:left;" | Residents for Uttlesford
| N/A
| N/A
| 5,231
| 
| N/A
| N/A
| 1.4
| 
| 0
| 0*(1)
| 0
|  1
|-
| style="background:black;"|
| style="text-align:left;" | Canvey Island Independents
| 1,655
| 2,777
| 3,654
|  877
| 0.4
| 0.9
| 1.0
|  0.1
| 1
| 1
| 2
| 1
|-
| style="background:#008800;"|
| style="text-align:left;" | Loughton Residents
| 2,764
| 3,286
| 2,824
|  462
| 0.7
| 1.1
| 0.8
|  0.3
| 1
| 1
| 1
| 
|-
| style="background-color:;" |
| style="text-align:left;" | Tendring First
| 5,866
| 4,093
| 1,332
|  2,761
| 1.5
| 1.4
| 0.4
|  1.0
| 0
| 0
| 0
| 
|-
| style="background-color:;" |
| style="text-align:left;" | BNP
| 35,037
| 909
| 847
|  62
| 8.9
| 0.3
| 0.2
|  0.1
| 0
| 0
| 0
| 
|-
| style="background:#915f6d;"|
| style="text-align:left;" | English Democrats
| 5,212
| 835
| 58
|  164
| 1.3
| 0.3
| 0.0
|  0.3
| 0
| 0
| 0
| 
|-
| style="background-color:;" |
| style="text-align:left;" | TUSC
| N/A
| 431
| N/A
| 
| N/A
| 0.1
| N/A
| 
| 0
| 0
| 0
| 
|-
| style="background-color:;" |
| style="text-align:left;" | National Front
| N/A
| 304
| N/A
| 
| N/A
| 0.1
| N/A
| 
| 0
| 0
| 0
| 
|-
! colspan="2" style="text-align:left;" | Total
! 392,506
! 328,435
! 372,834
!
! 100%
! 100%
! 100%
!
! 75
! 75
! 75
!
|}

County Hall

The county council chamber and main headquarters is at the County Hall in Chelmsford. Before 1938, the council regularly met in London near Moorgate, which with significant parts of the county close to that point and the dominance of railway travel had been more convenient than any place in the county. The County Hall, made a listed building in 2007, dates largely from the mid-1930s and is decorated with fine artworks of that period, mostly the gift of the family who owned the textile firm Courtaulds.

English region
Essex became part of the East of England Government Office Region in 1994 and was statistically counted as part of that region from 1999, having previously been part of the South East England region.

Essex Police

Essex Police covers the administrative county and the two unitary authorities.

Youth councils 
The Essex County Council also has a Youth Assembly, 75 members aged between 11 and 19 who aim to represent all young people in their districts across Essex. They decide on the priorities for young people and campaign to make a difference. With this, some district and unitary authorities may have their own youth councils, such as Epping Forest, Uttlesford and Harlow.

All these councillors are elected by their schools. The elections to the Young Essex Assembly occur in the respective schools in which the candidates are standing, likewise for the youth councils at a district and unitary level. These young people will then go on to represent their school and their parish/ward or (in the case of the Young Essex Assembly) their entire district.

The initiative seeks to engage younger people in the county and rely on the youth councillors of all status to work closely with schools and youth centres to improve youth services in Essex and help promote the opinions of Essex youth.

Local government

Borough and district level
The county of Essex is divided into 12 district and borough councils with 2 unitary authorities (Southend on Sea and Thurrock). The 12 councils manage housing, local planning, refuse collection, street cleaning, elections and meet in their respective civic offices. The local representatives are elected in parts in local elections, held every year.

Town and parish level
Town and parish councils vary in size from those with a population of around 200 to those with a population of over 30,000. Annual expenditure can vary greatly, depending on the circumstances of the individual council. Parish and town councils (local councils) have the same powers and duties, but a town council may elect a town mayor, rather than a chairman, each year in May.

There are just under 300 town and parish councils within Essex. These Councils have no statutory duties but can contribute to local life in a range of ways, such as maintaining allotments and open spaces, to crime prevention and providing recreation facilities. They can also influence other decision makers and can deliver services to meet local needs. Their powers and duties range

Town and parish councils have the right to become statutory consultees at both district and county level and, although the decision remains with the planning authorities, local councils can influence the decision-making process by making informed comments and recommendations.

National politics 

As of the 2019 general election, all 18 Essex seats are represented by Conservatives, all of them with absolute majorities (over 50% of the vote). There have previously been some Labour MPs: most recently, Thurrock, Harlow and Basildon in Labour's 2005 election victory. The Liberal Democrats until 2015 had a sizeable following in Essex, gaining Colchester in the 1997 general election.  The 2015 general election saw a large vote in Essex for the UK Independence Party (UKIP), with its only MP, Douglas Carswell, retaining the seat of Clacton that he had won in a 2014 by-election, and other strong performances, notably in Thurrock and Castle Point, but in the 2017 general election, UKIP's vote share plummeted by 15.6% while both Conservative and Labour rose by 9%. This resulted in Labour regaining second place in Essex, increasing their vote share across the county and cutting some Conservative majorities in areas that had been unaffected by the 1997 general election, namely Rochford and Southend East and Southend West.

In 2015, Thurrock was a three-way marginal, with UKIP, Labour and the Conservatives gaining 30%, 31% and 32% respectively. In 2017, the Conservatives held Thurrock with an increased share of the vote, but a smaller margin of victory. It was the constituency in which UKIP performed best in 2017, with 20% of the vote, while all other areas had been reduced to low single-figure vote shares. Several new MPs were elected in the 2017 election, with Alex Burghart, Vicky Ford, Giles Watling and Kemi Badenoch all replacing senior Conservative politicians Sir Eric Pickles, Sir Simon Burns, Douglas Carswell and Sir Alan Haselhurst, respectively.

At the 2019 general election, Castle Point constituency recorded the highest vote share for the Conservatives in the entire United Kingdom, with 76.7%. The most marginal constituency in the county is Colchester; however the Conservative Party still command a majority of over 9,400 votes.

In the 2016 EU referendum, 62.3% of voters in Essex voted to leave the EU, with all 14 District Council areas voting to leave, the smallest margin being in Uttlesford.

|-
! rowspan="2" colspan="2" style="text-align:left;" | Party
! colspan="4"|Votes cast
! colspan="4"|%
! colspan="4"|Seats
|-
!2015
!2017
!2019
! ±
!2015
!2017
!2019
! ±
!2015
!2017
!2019
! ±
|-
| style="background:#0087dc;"|
| style="text-align:left;" | Conservative
| 436,758
| 528,949
| 577,118
|  48,169
| 49.6
| 59.0
| 64.8
|  5.8
| 17
| 18
| 18
| 
|-
| style="background:#dc241f;"|
| style="text-align:left;" | Labour
| 171,026
| 261,671
| 189,471
|  72,200
| 19.4
| 29.2
| 21.2
|  8.0
| 0
| 0
| 0
| 
|-
| style="background:#fdbb30;"|
| style="text-align:left;" | Liberal Democrat
| 58,592
| 46,254
| 95,078
|  48,824
| 6.6
| 5.1
| 10.6
|  5.5
| 0
| 0
| 0
| 
|-
| style="background:#6ab023;"|
| style="text-align:left;" | Green
| 25,993
| 12,343
| 20,438
|  8,095
| 3.0
| 1.3
| 2.3
|  1.0
| 0
| 0
| 0
| 
|-
| style="background:#e9e9e9;"|
| style="text-align:left;" | Independents
| 6,919
| 4,179
| 10,224
|  6,045
| 0.7
| 0.4
| 1.1
|  0.7
| 0
| 0
| 0
| 
|-
| style="background:#fff000;"|
| style="text-align:left;" | Monster Raving Loony
| N/A
| N/A
| 804
|  804
| N/A
| N/A
| 0.09
|  0.09
| 0
| 0
| 0
| 
|-
| style="background:#915f6d;"|
| style="text-align:left;" | English Democrats
| 453
| 289
| 532
|  243
| 0.05
| 0.03
| 0.06
|  0.03
| 0
| 0
| 0
| 
|-
| style="background:#D25469;"|
| style="text-align:left;" | SDP
| N/A
| N/A
| 394
|  394
| N/A
| N/A
| 0.04
|  0.04
| 0
| 0
| 0
| 
|-
| style="background:#FF01FF;"|
| style="text-align:left;" | Psychedelic Future
| N/A
| N/A
| 367
|  367
| N/A
| N/A
| 0.04
|  0.04
| 0
| 0
| 0
| 
|-
| style="background:#ff0;"|
| style="text-align:left;" | YPP
| 80
| 110
| 170
|  60
| 0.00
| 0.01
| 0.02
|  0.01
| 0
| 0
| 0
| 
|-
| style="background:#70147a;"|
| style="text-align:left;" | UKIP
| 177,756
| 41,478
| N/A
|  41,478
| 20.2
| 4.6
| N/A
|  4.6
| 1
| 0
| 0
| 
|-
! colspan="2" style="text-align:left;" | Total
! 879,918
! 896,231
! 894,608
!
! 100%
! 100%
! 100%
!
! 18
! 18
! 18
!
|}

Economy 
A high proportion of the population, especially in the south, work outside the county, commuting to London and elsewhere by rail and by road. These London-based jobs are often well paid and complement the contribution made by the employers based within Essex.

Industry is largely limited to the south of the county, with the majority of the land elsewhere being given over to agriculture. Harlow is a centre for electronics, science and pharmaceutical companies. Chelmsford has been an important location for electronics companies, such as the Marconi Company, since the industry was born; it is also the location for a number of insurance and financial services organisations and, until 2015, was the home of the soft drinks producer Britvic. Basildon is home to New Holland Agriculture's European headquarters as well as the Ford Motor Company's British HQ. Debden, in Loughton, is home to a production facility for British and foreign banknotes.

Other businesses in the county are dominated by mechanical engineering, including but not limited to metalworking, glassmaking and plastics and the service sector. Colchester is a garrison town and the local economy is helped by the Army's personnel living there. Basildon is the location of State Street Corporation's United Kingdom HQ International Financial Data Services and remains heavily dependent on London for employment, due to its proximity and direct transport routes. Southend-on-Sea is home to the Adventure Island theme park and is one of the few still growing British seaside resorts, benefiting from modern and direct rail links from Fenchurch Street railway station and Liverpool Street station (so that housing is in high demand, especially for financial services commuters), which maintains the town's commercial and general economy.

Parts of eastern Essex suffer from high levels of deprivation; one of the most highly deprived wards is in the seaside town of Clacton. In the Indices of deprivation 2007, Jaywick was identified as the most deprived Lower Super Output Area in Southern England. Unemployment was estimated at 44% and many homes were found to lack very basic amenities. The Brooklands and Grasslands area of Jaywick was found to be the third-most deprived area in England; two areas in Liverpool and Manchester were rated more deprived. In contrast, mid, west and south-west Essex is one of the most affluent parts of eastern England, forming part of the London commuter belt. There is a large middle class here and the area is widely known for its private schools. In 2008, The Daily Telegraph found Ingatestone and Brentwood to be the 14th- and 19th-richest towns in the UK respectively.

Transport 
Much of Essex lies within the London commuter belt, with radial transport links to the capital an important part of the area's economy. There are nationally or regionally important ports and airports and these also rely on the Essex infrastructure, causing an additional load on the local road and rail links.

Railway
Essex's railway routes to London are, running clockwise:
 The West Anglia Main Line from Liverpool Street to Harlow, Stansted Airport and onward to Cambridgeshire.
 The southern part of Epping Forest district is served by the London Underground Central line.
 The Great Eastern Main Line from Liverpool Street to Shenfield, Chelmsford, Colchester and onto East Anglia. The Great Eastern includes branch lines to:
 Harwich and its port. The nearby port of Felixstowe in Suffolk is served by a separate branch.
 The Sunshine Coast Line linking Colchester to the seaside resorts of Clacton-on-Sea and Walton-on-the-Naze via the picturesque towns of Wivenhoe and Great Bentley.
 Braintree.
 Branch from Marks Tey to Sudbury (Suffolk) and villages in-between.
 In the densely populated south, there is a branch to Southend Victoria, the Rochford Peninsula and several south Essex towns. This branch has a sub-branch – the Crouch Valley Line – linking Wickford to the remote Dengie Peninsula, including Burnham-on-Crouch and Southminster.
 Like the Southend Victoria branch, the London, Tilbury & Southend Railway also serves Southend (Southend Central), the Rochford Peninsula and many towns in the densely populated south of the county. The London terminus is Fenchurch Street and heading eastward from Barking, the line separates into three, which later merge back into one by the time the railway reaches Pitsea.

The Essex Thameside franchise is operated by c2c. The Greater Anglia routes (both the West Anglia and Great Eastern Main Line and their branches) are operated by Greater Anglia.

Road

Essex has six main strategic routes, five of which reflect the powerful influence exerted by London.

The M25 is London's orbital motorway which redistributes traffic across the London area. It includes the Dartford Road Crossings, over the Thames Estuary, linking Essex to Kent.

There are four radial commuter routes into the capital:
 M11 motorway, which also serves Stansted Airport and provides commuter links to Cambridge.
 A12, to East Anglia via Chelmsford and Colchester. It also serves the ports of Harwich and Felixstowe (Suffolk).
 A127, to the Rochford Peninsula, including Southend and Southend Airport. This is no longer maintained as a trunk road.
 A13, to the Rochford Peninsula, also including Southend. It also serves the expanding Tilbury and London Gateway ports.

The A120 is a major route heading west from the ports of Harwich and Felixstowe (Suffolk) and, like the A12, the route was in use during the Roman period and, in part at least, before then.

Ports and waterborne transport
The Port of Tilbury is one of Britain's three major ports and has proposed a major extension onto the site of the former Tilbury power stations. The port of Harwich has passenger and freight services to the Hook of Holland and a freight service to Europoort. A service to Esbjerg, Denmark ceased in September 2014 and earlier a service to Cuxhaven in Germany was discontinued in December 2005.

The UK's largest container terminal London Gateway at Shell Haven in Thurrock partly opened in November 2013; final completion date is yet to be confirmed. The port was opposed by the local authority and environmental and wildlife organisations.

The ports have branch lines to connect them to the national rail network. These freight movements conflict with the needs of commuter passenger services, limiting their frequency and reliability.

East of the Dartford Road Crossing to Dartford in Kent, across the Thames Estuary, a pedestrian ferry to Gravesend, Kent operates from Tilbury during limited daily hours; there are pedestrian ferries across some of Essex's rivers and estuaries in spring and summer.

Airports

The main airport in Essex is Stansted Airport, serving destinations in Europe, North Africa and Asia. The Conservative-Liberal Democrat coalition government, formed in May 2010, agreed not to allow a further runway until a set time period, so curtailing the operator's ambitions for expansion. London Southend Airport, once one of Britain's busiest airports, opened a new runway extension, terminal building and railway station in March 2012. It has a station on the Shenfield to Southend Line, with a direct link to London.

Southend Airport has scheduled flights to Ireland, the Channel Islands and multiple destinations in Europe. Essex has several smaller airfields, some of which owe their origins to military bases built during World War I or World War II, giving pleasure flights or flying lessons; these include Clacton Airfield, Earls Colne Airfield and Stapleford Aerodrome.

Culture and community

Symbols

Both the Flag of Essex and the county's coat of arms comprise three Saxon seax knives (although they look rather more like scimitars), mainly white and pointing to the right (from the point of view of the observer), arranged vertically one above another on a red background (Gules three Seaxes fesswise in pale Argent pommels and hilts Or, points to the sinister and notches to the base). The three-seax device is also used as the official logo of Essex County Council; this was granted in 1932.

The emblem was attributed to Anglo-Saxon Essex in Early Modern historiography. The earliest reference to the arms of the East Saxon kings was by Richard Verstegan, the author of A Restitution of Decayed Intelligence (Antwerp, 1605), claiming that "Erkenwyne king of the East-Saxons did beare for his armes, three [seaxes] argent, in a field gules". There is no earlier evidence substantiating Verstegan's claim, which is an anachronism for the Anglo-Saxon period seeing that heraldry only evolved in the 12th century, well after the Norman Conquest.

John Speed in his Historie of Great Britaine (1611) follows Verstegan in his descriptions of the arms of Erkenwyne, but he qualifies the statement by adding "as some or our heralds have emblazed".

The cowslip is the county plant of Essex.

Patron saint
The East Saxon royal house had converted the Christianity around 604 AD, but subsequently apostasised. In the mid 7th century, a new Christian king, Sigeberht the Good, requested help from the monks of Lindisfarne in promoting Christianity among his people.

St Cedd, an Irish trained Northumbrian monk, sailed south and established a chapel, dedicated to St Peter, on the site of the old Roman fort of Othona (modern Bradwell-on-Sea), a chapel which still stands. Cedd, who was well known for confronting political authority, filled the vacant position of Bishop of London – the Bishop of the East Saxons. The feast day of St Cedd, also known as Essex Day, is marked on the 26th October.

Speech
The county has its own Essex dialect, though this has lost ground to other forms so that it is now chiefly spoken in parts of the north and among older residents. It has been partially replaced by Received Pronunciation (RP) and Cockney, a form originally heavily influenced by the Essex dialect.

The prevalence of Cockney, particularly in the south, is the result of the large-scale migration of East Londoners to Essex, the Cockney Diaspora, particularly after World War II. A blend of RP and Cockney is widely heard, and known as Estuary English.

Traditions
Essex is also home to the Dunmow Flitch Trials, a traditional ceremony that takes place every four years and consists of a test of a married couple's devotion to one another. A common claim of the origin of the Dunmow Flitch dates back to 1104 and the Augustinian priory of Little Dunmow, founded by Lady Juga Baynard. Lord of the Manor Reginald Fitzwalter and his wife dressed themselves as humble folk and begged blessing of the Prior a year and a day after marriage. The prior, impressed by their devotion, bestowed upon them a flitch of bacon. Upon revealing his true identity, Fitzwalter gave his land to the priory on condition that a flitch should be awarded to any couple who could claim they were similarly devoted.

By the 14th century, the Dunmow Flitch Trials appear to have achieved a significant reputation outside the local area. The author William Langland, who lived on the Welsh borders, mentions it in his 1362 book The Vision of Piers Plowman in a manner that implies general knowledge of the custom among his readers.

Sport

Football
The ceremonial county is home to two professional sides, Southend United and Colchester United with Metropolitan Essex home to three more - West Ham United, Leyton Orient and Dagenham & Redbridge.

Essex also has a number of other clubs which play below English football’s fifth tier. Billericay Town, Braintree Town, Chelmsford City and Concord Rangers all play in the National League South. The highest domestic trophy for non-league teams, the FA Trophy, has been won on three occasions by Essex teams: Colchester United (1992), Canvey Island (2001) and by Grays Athletic in 2006. The FA Vase has been won three times by Billericay Town in 1976, 1977 and 1979, and by Stansted in 1984.

Cricket
Essex County Cricket Club became a first-class county in 1894. The county has won eight County Championship league titles; six of these were won during the dominant period between 1979 and 1992, with a gap of 25 years before the county's next titles in 2017 and 2019.

Other sports
The county is also home to the Romford Raiders and Chelmsford Chieftains ice hockey teams and the Essex Leopards basketball team. It is home to the amateur rugby league football teams the Eastern Rhinos and Brentwood Eels (Essex Eels). Defunct teams include the Essex Pirates basketball team, as well as speedway teams the Lakeside Hammers (formerly Arena Essex Hammers), the Rayleigh Rockets and the Romford Bombers.

During the 2012 London Olympics, Hadleigh Farm played host to the mountain bike races. London Stadium, which was the host of the games, is located within the historical Essex boundaries.

Essex has one horse racing venue, Chelmsford City Racecourse at Great Leighs. Horse racing also took place at Chelmsford Racecourse in Galleywood until 1935. The county has one current greyhound racing track, Harlow Stadium. Rayleigh Weir Stadium and Southend Stadium are former greyhound venues.

Team Essex Volleyball Club is Chelmsford's national league volleyball club. It has four teams which play in Volleyball England's national volleyball league. Its men's 1st team currently competes in the top division in the country, the Super 8s, while the women's 1st team competes one tier below the men. The club has a strong junior programme and trains at The Boswells School in Chelmsford.

Sportspeople 
Many famous sports stars have come from or trained in Essex. These have included swimmer Mark Foster; cricket stars Trevor Bailey, Nasser Hussain, Alastair Cook and Graham Gooch; footballers Peter Taylor, James Tomkins, Justin Edinburgh, Nigel Spink; tennis stars John Lloyd and David Lloyd; Olympic Gold-winning gymnast Max Whitlock; Olympic sailing champion Saskia Clark; World Champion snooker stars Stuart Bingham and Steve Davis; world champion boxers Terry Marsh, Nigel Benn and Frank Bruno; London Marathon winner Eamonn Martin; international rugby players Malcolm O'Kelly and Stuart Barnes; Formula 1 sports car drivers Johnny Herbert and Perry McCarthy.

Television
The county is served by BBC East and ITV Anglia, but southern parts of Essex are also served by BBC London and ITV London.

Education

Education in Essex is substantially provided by three authorities: Essex County Council and the two unitary authorities, Southend-on-Sea and Thurrock. In all there are some 90 state secondary schools provided by these authorities, the majority of which are comprehensive, although one in Uttlesford, two in Chelmsford, two in Colchester and four in Southend-on-Sea are selective grammar schools. There are also various independent schools particularly, as mentioned above, in rural parts and the west of the county.

The University of Essex, which was established in 1963, is located just outside Colchester, with two further campuses in Loughton and Southend-on-Sea.

Anglia Ruskin University has a campus in Chelmsford. Lord Ashcroft International Business School, Faculty of Medical Science, Faculty of Science and Technology, Anglia Law School, Faculty of Health, Social Care & Education and School of Medicine are located in the campus area.

Writtle University College, at Writtle, near Chelmsford, offers both higher and further education in land-management subjects.

Landmarks
Over 14,000 buildings have listed status in the county and around 1,000 of those are recognised as of Grade I or II* importance. The buildings range from the 7th century Saxon church of St Peter-on-the-Wall, to the Royal Corinthian Yacht Club which was the United Kingdom's entry in the 'International Exhibition of Modern Architecture' held at the Museum of Modern Art in New York City in 1932. Southend Pier is in the Guinness Book of Records as the longest pleasure pier in the world.

Places of interest

 Abberton Reservoir
 Anglia Ruskin University Chelmsford campus
 Ashdon (The site of the ancient Bartlow Hills and also a claimant as the location of the Battle of Ashingdon)
 Ashingdon (The site of the Battle of Ashingdon in 1016), near Southend, with its isolated St Andrews Church and site of England's earliest aerodrome at South Fambridge
 Audley End House and Gardens, Saffron Walden 
 Brentwood Cathedral 
 Clacton-on-Sea
 Chelmsford Cathedral 
 Colchester Castle  
 Colchester Zoo 
 Colne Valley Railway 
 Cressing Temple
 East Anglian Railway Museum 
 Epping Forest
 Epping Ongar Railway 
 Finchingfield (home of the author Dodie Smith)
 Frinton-on-Sea
 Great Bentley, which has the largest village green in England
 Hadleigh Castle
 Harlow New Town
 Hedingham Castle, between Stansted and Colchester, to the north of Braintree 
 Ingatestone Hall, Ingatestone, between Brentwood and Chelmsford
 Kelvedon Hatch Secret Nuclear Bunker
 Lakeside Shopping Centre
 Loughton, near Epping Forest
 Maldon historic market town, close to Chelmsford and the North Sea, and site of the Battle of Maldon
 Mangapps Railway Museum   (Burnham-on-Crouch)
 Marsh Farm Country Park (South Woodham Ferrers)
 Mersea Island, birdwatching and rambling resort with one settlement, West Mersea
 Mistley Towers, Manningtree, between Colchester and Ipswich, near Alton Water.
 Mountfitchet Castle , Stansted
 North Weald Airfield
 Northey Island
 Orsett Hall Hotel, Prince Charles Avenue, Orsett near Chadwell St Mary
 Real Circumstance Theatre Company
 Royal Gunpowder Mills in Waltham Abbey
 St Peter-on-the-Wall 
 Saffron Walden   
 Southend Pier
 Thames Estuary 
 Tilbury Fort 
 Thaxted, south of Saffron Walden
 Thurrock Thameside Nature Park
 University of Essex (Wivenhoe Park, Colchester and Loughton)
 Waltham Abbey Church

Notable people

Sister counties and regions
  Jiangsu, China
  Picardy, France
  Thuringia, Germany
  Henrico County, Virginia, United States
  Accra, Ghana

See also
 Custos Rotulorum of Essex – Keepers of the Rolls
 Earl of Essex
 Essex (UK Parliament constituency)
 Essex Police and Crime Commissioner
 Healthcare in Essex
 High Sheriff of Essex
 List of civil parishes in England
 List of Sites of Special Scientific Interest in Essex
 Lord Lieutenant of Essex
 Q Camp: WWII camp in Essex
 Essex girl
 University of Essex
 The Hundred Parishes

References

External links

 
 Essex County Council
 Seax – Essex Archives Online
 Images of Essex at the English Heritage Archive

 
Non-metropolitan counties
NUTS 2 statistical regions of the United Kingdom
English royal forests
Home counties
Counties of England established in antiquity